Kari Adamsons is an associate professor of human development and family studies at University of Connecticut. She is a nationally recognized expert on fathers, including father-child relationships, co-parenting, shared parenting and couple relationships. Adamsons is a co-author of Family Theories: An Introduction, a widely used university textbook.

Early life and education
As an undergraduate, Adamsons studied psychology, graduating in 1996 with a B.A. from College of William and Mary. Subsequently, she enrolled at the human development and family studies program at the University of North Carolina at Greensboro, obtaining first a master's degree in 2002 followed by a doctoral degree in 2006. After one year as a postdoctoral fellow she became a faculty member at the University of Connecticut in 2007.

Scientific work
Adamsons is most known for her work on fathers and father-child relationships, especially during transition to fatherhood and during and after divorce or separation. She has shown that quality time with their non-custodial fathers is very important for the well-being of children whose parents have divorced. She has further concluded that it is not only the quality but also the quantity of time that matters.

Adamsons other important research areas include family theory, identity theory, bioecological theory and couple relationships.

Selected publications

Books
 White JM, Martin TF, Adamsons K. Family theories: An introduction. Sage Publications, 3rd edition, 2018.

Scientific articles
 Adamsons K, Pasley K. Coparenting following divorce and relationship dissolution. Handbook of divorce and relationship dissolution. 2006:241-61.
 Adamsons K, Buehler C. Mothering versus fathering versus parenting: Measurement equivalence in parenting measures. Parenting: Science and Practice. 2007 Jul 30;7(3):271-303.
 Adamsons K, Pasley K. An ecological approach to father involvement in biological and stepfather families. Fathering. 2007 Mar 22;5(2):129-48.
 Adamsons K. Using identity theory to develop a midrange model of parental gatekeeping and parenting behavior. Journal of Family Theory & Review. 2010 Jun;2(2):137-48.
 Adamsons K, Johnson SK. An updated and expanded meta-analysis of nonresident fathering and child well-being. Journal of Family Psychology. 2013 Aug;27(4):589.
 Palkovitz R, Trask BS, Adamsons K. Essential differences in the meaning and processes of mothering and fathering: Family systems, feminist and qualitative perspectives. Journal of Family Theory & Review. 2014 Dec 1;6(4):406-20. 
 Adamsons K. Quantity versus quality of nonresident father involvement: Deconstructing the argument that quantity doesn't matter. Journal of Child Custody. 2018 Jan 2;15(1):26-34.

Other
 Adamsons K. Commonalities and Diversities of Fathering - Overall Commentary on Fathering, Encyclopedia on Early Childhood Development, 2016.

References

External links 
 Kari Adamsons, Human Development and Family Studies, University of Connecticut.
 

Living people
American women psychologists
21st-century American psychologists
Fatherhood
Family sociologists
People from Connecticut
University of Connecticut faculty
Year of birth missing (living people)
College of William & Mary alumni
University of North Carolina at Greensboro alumni